Lev Lvovich Kamenev (1834, according to other information in 1833, Rylsk, Kursk Governorate –  Savvinskaya sloboda, Moscow Governorate), was a Russian landscape painter.

Biography
Kamenev was born in 1834. Soon afterwards, his father, a small trader, moved with the family in Astrakhan, where Lev studied at the local grammar school, but not finished it because of the father was in need of assistant, and took him to own shop. A passion for painting with Lev Kamenev saw grandfather of Konstantin Korovin, who arranged him to own office and gave him five thousand rubles for admission to the Art school in St. Petersburg.

In 1854, aged twenty-one year, he went to Moscow and entered the Moscow School of Painting, Sculpture and Architecture with the coming celebrities as Ivan Shishkin and Vasily Perov, where he studied under the mentoring Karl Rabus, and after his death in 1857, under the mentoring Alexei Savrasov. In 1858 Kamenev was bestowed the title of the professional painter of the 3d degree and became a member of the Moscow Society of Amateurs of Arts, at the expense of it he departed for a two-year trip abroad for learning and mastery of Western European artists. Traveling to Germany and Switzerland, he carried out together with Ivan Shishkin.

The peak of Kamenev's career was in the 1860-70s, when his painting Winter Road became part of the Tretyakov collection. In 1869 for the painting Winter View from the Outskirts of Moscow and View from the Outskirts of Porechye he received the title of academician of the Academy of Arts landscape painting and became a member and one of the founders of The Association of Traveling Art Exhibitions (Peredvizhniki). Between the 1871-1884 Kamenev took part at the exhibitions of the Association. In 1886 Kamenev died in poverty and solitude.

Works

References

1830s births
1886 deaths
People from Rylsky District
People from Rylsky Uyezd
19th-century painters from the Russian Empire
Russian male painters
19th-century male artists from the Russian Empire
Moscow School of Painting, Sculpture and Architecture alumni